Caroline Beatrix Bridgeman, Viscountess Bridgeman, DBE, JP (née Parker; 30 June 1873 – 26 December 1961) was an English aristocrat, political activist, and churchwoman.

Life

Born to Hon. Cecil Thomas Parker, son of the 6th Earl of Macclesfield, and Rosamond Esther Harriet Longley, daughter of Archbishop of Canterbury Charles Thomas Longley, she married the 1st Viscount Bridgeman (1864-1935) on 30 April 1895 in Eccleston, Chester, England. As a result of her marriage, she was styled as Viscountess Bridgeman on 18 June 1929.

She was invested as a Dame Commander of the Order of the British Empire (DBE) in 1924, after which she was also known as Dame Caroline Bridgeman. Bridgeman held the office Justice of Peace (JP) and was a governor of the BBC between 1935 and 1939. She died on 26 December 1961 of undisclosed causes, aged 88.

Children
 Sir Robert Clive Bridgeman, 2nd Viscount Bridgeman (1 April 1896 - 17 November 1982) 
 Brigadier Hon. Geoffrey John Orlando Bridgeman (3 July 1898 - 15 October 1974) 
 Anne Bridgeman (23 July 1900 - 24 July 1900) 
 Hon. Sir Maurice Richard Bridgeman (26 January 1904 - 18 June 1980)

Arms

Citations 
 G.E. Cokayne; with Vicary Gibbs, H.A. Doubleday, Geoffrey H. White, Duncan Warrand and Lord Howard de Walden, editors, The Complete Peerage of England, Scotland, Ireland, Great Britain and the United Kingdom, Extant, Extinct or Dormant, new ed., 13 volumes in 14 (1910-1959; reprint in 6 volumes, Gloucester, UK: Alan Sutton Publishing, 2000), volume XIII, page 460. Hereinafter cited as The Complete Peerage. 
 Peter W. Hammond, editor, The Complete Peerage or a History of the House of Lords and All its Members From the Earliest Times, Volume XIV: Addenda & Corrigenda (Stroud, Gloucestershire: Sutton Publishing, 1998), page 705. Hereinafter cited as The Complete Peerage, Volume XIV. 
 Charles Mosley, editor, Burke's Peerage, Baronetage & Knightage, 107th edition, 3 volumes (Wilmington, Delaware: Burke's Peerage (Genealogical Books) Ltd., 2003), volume 1, page 498. Hereinafter cited as Burke's Peerage and Baronetage, 107th edition. 
 Cokayne, and others, The Complete Peerage, volume XIII, p. 461. 
 Charles Mosley, Burke's Peerage and Baronetage, 107th edition, volume 1, page 499.

Notes

External links
The Peerage.com
Terramedia

1873 births
1961 deaths
Dames Commander of the Order of the British Empire
British viscountesses
Bridgeman, Caroline
Caroline
English justices of the peace